Sonja van der Bliek is a Canadian ice hockey goaltender, currently playing with Brynäs IF in the SDHL.

Career 
By the time she graduated, she held 12 individual programme records, and was named team MVP in her final year. She was nominated for the 2010 Patty Kazmaier Memorial Award. In 2020, she was inducted into the RPI Athletics Hall of Fame.

After graduation, she signed with the Brampton Thunder in the CWHL. In 2016, she left Brampton to sign with the Toronto Furies, where she would spend two years as backup before earning the starting job for the 2017–18 season. Across six years in the CWHL, van der Bliek would play 54 games.

After the CWHL folded, she signed with Brynäs in Sweden. In her first season, the team would make the SDHL playoffs, losing to Modo in the first round.

Personal life 
She is of Dutch and Norwegian descent.

References

External links
 Biographical information and career statistics from Elite Prospect

Brampton Thunder players
Toronto Furies players
1989 births
Living people
Ice hockey people from Toronto
Canadian women's ice hockey goaltenders
RPI Engineers women's ice hockey players
Brynäs IF players